"Olympia" is an EP recorded by The Maybes?. The picture on the cover is of one of the iron statues in Antony Gormley's Another Place attraction located on Crosby Beach, Merseyside.

Track listing
Track Listing for CD and download formats of the EP. All songs written by The Maybes?.
"The Rock 'n' Roll" – 2:18
"Actions" – 3:00
"Get on the Resin" – 3:40
"Supercharge" – 4:01

"The Rock 'n' Roll" music video
The lead song from the EP, "The Rock 'n' Roll", was turned into a music video to promote Olympia, and it was released on online video websites such as YouTube. The music video shows home videos, live performances and photographs of the band, and also shown in the video are The Maybes? band name and their slogan, "Fight for Your Mind", sprayed on the walls of different places in Liverpool. Other footage includes their neighbourhood and landmarks as well as footage from an Everton F.C. match.

References

External links
"Maybes?, The – Olympia" on Discogs.com
"The Maybes ? – Olympia MP3 Download" on 7digital.com
MySpace band profile
Video on YouTube

2006 EPs